Ryan Wilkins is a Welsh rugby union player, currently playing for United Rugby Championship side Cardiff. His preferred position is centre or wing.

Cardiff
Wilkins was named in the Cardiff academy squad for the 2021–22 season. He made his debut for Cardiff in the first round of the 2021–22 European Rugby Champions Cup against  coming on as a replacement.

References

Living people
Welsh rugby union players
Cardiff Rugby players
Rugby union centres
Rugby union wings
Year of birth missing (living people)